Myrina silenus, the common fig-tree blue, is a butterfly of the family Lycaenidae. It is found in Sub-Saharan Africa, southern Arabia and northern Oman.

The wingspan is 26.5–34 mm for males and 33–41 mm for females. Adults are on wing year-round with peaks from September to October and from April to June in the eastern part of the range.

The larvae feed on Ficus species, including F. capensis, F. cordata, F. sur, F. pumila and F. ingens.

Subspecies
 M. s. silenus
Range: Senegal, Gambia, Guinea-Bissau, Guinea, Sierra Leone, Liberia, Ivory Coast, Ghana, Togo, Benin, Nigeria, Cameroon, Congo, Angola, DRC, Chad, Sudan, Uganda, north-western Zambia
 M. s. nzoiae d'Abrera, 1980
Range: Ethiopia, Yemen, Saudi Arabia, United Arab Emirates,  northern Oman, western and northern Kenya
 M. s. ficedula (Trimen, 1879)
Range: southern Kenya, Tanzania, Zambia, Mozambique, Zimbabwe, Botswana, Namibia: Caprivi, Eswatini, South Africa: Limpopo, Mpumalanga, North West, Gauteng, Free State, KwaZulu-Natal, Eastern Cape and Western Cape provinces
 M. s. penningtoni Dickson & Stephen, 1971
Range: western South Africa: Western Cape to Northern Cape
 M. s. suzannae Larsen & Plowes, 1991
Range: northern Namibia

References

External links
Die Gross-Schmetterlinge der Erde 13: Die Afrikanischen Tagfalter. Plate XIII 66 e, f as ficedula
Die Gross-Schmetterlinge der Erde 13: Die Afrikanischen Tagfalter. Plate XIII 68 a

Amblypodiini
Butterflies described in 1775
Fauna of Rivers State
Taxa named by Johan Christian Fabricius